Great may refer to:

Descriptions or measurements
 Great, a relative measurement in physical space, see Size
 Greatness, being divine, majestic, superior, majestic, or transcendent

People 
 List of people known as "the Great"
Artel Great (born 1981), American actor

Other uses
 Great (1975 film), a British animated short about Isambard Kingdom Brunel
 Great (2013 film), a German short film
 Great (supermarket), a supermarket in Hong Kong
 GReAT, Graph Rewriting and Transformation, a Model Transformation Language
 Gang Resistance Education and Training, or GREAT, a school-based and police officer-instructed program
 Global Research and Analysis Team (GReAT), a cybersecurity team at Kaspersky Lab
Great!, a 2018 EP by Momoland
The Great (TV series), an American comedy-drama

See also